Where You At may refer to:

 Where You At?, a 2002 album by Amanda Perez
 "Where You At" (Joe song), 2006
 "Where You At" (Jennifer Hudson song), 2011
 "Where You At", a 2017 song by NU'EST W
"Where You At", a 2019 song by Loona from X X
 "WYAT (Where You At)", a 2022 song by SB19